Sandi Brandenberg is a fictional character appearing in American comic books published by Marvel Comics. She is usually depicted as a supporting character and has been associated with both Deadpool and Agent X.

Fictional character biography

Sandi first appeared in the Taskmaster limited series. Little is known of her previous life, save that she is kind to stray animals and used to work as a "dancer" (implied to be of the exotic kind). She met the villain trainer and mercenary in his guise of Tony Masters in Las Vegas and he put his mimicked skills to use in seducing her. During a date at his apartment in New York City, Sandi is shot by a Triad gang member as part of a revenge attack on Taskmaster for manipulating the Triads into a gangwar. Taskmaster survived and took her injury personally, later arranging for her medical care and for her to find work once she had recovered. This led to her appearances in the final story arc of Deadpool, written by Gail Simone. After the title character falsely won acclaim in the mercenary community for assassinating four yakuza mob bosses, he hired her as a secretary and receptionist to handle his increased workload. Though not outright stated, this was apparently on Taskmaster's recommendation. Although their relationship did not progress following her discovery of his identity and his shooting, Taskmaster guardedly held feelings for her, even offering help to a beleaguered Deadpool free of charge, disclaiming that his offer was on the basis that if Deadpool died, Sandi would be out of a job.

Deadpool viewed Sandi as a friend, admitting that his business would fall apart without her and giving her a generous bonus after being paid a large sum. Sandi also designed some new costumes for Wade. Deadpool was very protective of her, and was upset when she came in to work with a black eye, courtesy of her current boyfriend. When another fight with him landed her in the hospital, Sandi agreed to let Deadpool retaliate and run him out of town, but insisted he not be killed. Deadpool complied with this request, giving the boyfriend a severe beating but refraining from killing him, saying it was "because I made a promise." Taskmaster, who was lurking nearby and still had strong feelings for Sandi, immediately killed him after Deadpool left, sarcastically telling him "You know, it's a funny thing, but I never promised her squat."

After Wilson's disappearance and apparent death, Sandi found the man who would be known as both Alex Hayden and Agent X outside her apartment and sympathetically took him in and fed him. Although he had little to no memory of his life before this incident, he remembered Sandi and wished to go into the mercenary business with her. She agreed and retained the services of Taskmaster (whom she began a relationship with) and Outlaw to train him.

Sandi was an important character throughout the Agent X series, and was wooed by a yakuza boss as well as by Taskmaster who still pined for her. She and Agent X slept together once, but in the end she got back together with Taskmaster, and Alex ended up with Outlaw.

When Alex is captured by HYDRA on a mission, Sandi and Outlaw hire Deadpool to retrieve him. Having been given morbid obesity to keep him contained, Agent X is unable to return to mercenary work and allows Wade to take over for him. Since then, Sandi made multiple appearances in the Cable & Deadpool series, even being briefly captured by Wilson's nemesis T-Ray. She and Outlaw seem to enjoy playing strip poker with any handy male characters (who are only too happy to oblige).

References

Fictional secretaries
Comics characters introduced in 2002
Marvel Comics sidekicks
Deadpool characters